(born March 18, 1974) is a Japanese manga artist, visual designer and graphic designer, most notable for writing and illustrating the manga series Afro Samurai.

Early life
Okazaki was born in Kanagawa Prefecture and graduated from the Tama University of the Arts.

Career
Okazaki was one of four artists to debut in the self-published Nou Nou Hau manga magazine in November 1998. His first manga series, Afro Samurai, was first published as a dōjinshi in the preparatory issue zero of the magazine, and was featured as the cover. Afro Samurai was serialized until the magazine's end in September 2002. Afro Samurai was adapted into an anime miniseries and a sequel television film, Afro Samurai: Resurrection. After the release of the anime series, Takashi Okazaki went back and recreated the original dōjinshi into a two-volume manga series which was released in the United States by Tor Books and Seven Seas Entertainment. Also, the first volume has been released in Germany, the second to be released in August 2011.

On November 23, 2004, Okazaki wrote and illustrated a 9-panel manga published in the pamphlet of the Blade: Trinity soundtrack. Takashi Okazaki also illustrated the ending of the  series serialized in a flyer handed out at the Japanese club "UNIT". Cho-Kōryu-Gōjin Danke Choen was created by Kugelblitz — a collaborative effort between Nou Nou Hau and the German comic magazine Moga Mobo. Okazaki also designed the characters in The Game Baker's 2016 game, Furi. He is also credited as original character designer for the 2017 Garo: Vanishing Line anime.

In April 2020, Okazaki made his debut as a Marvel Comics cover artist for the re-launch of Werewolf By Night. He has also created covers for multiple other Marvel titles, including Black Widow, Non-Stop Spiderman, Falcon & Winter Soldier, Iron Fist Heart of the Dragon, and Deadpool: Black, White & Blood.

Okazaki created the portrait of Los Angeles Angels two-way player Shohei Ohtani for the cover of the MVP and Digital Deluxe editions of MLB The Show 22. He also creates art for cards used in the game mode Diamond Dynasty in MLB The Show 22, which includes many Baseball Hall of Fame players, such as Randy Johnson, Babe Ruth, Ken Griffey Jr, Rickey Henderson and Honus Wagner.

Bibliography
Afro Samurai! (dojinshi manga, 1998–2002)
9-panel Blade:Trinity comic (2004)
 (2005)
Afro Samurai Maniaxxx!!! (2007)
Afro Samurai (recreation, 2008–2009)
Summer Wars animated movie (character design, 2009)
Izanagi Online mobile video game (character design, 2015)
Furi video game (artistic director, 2016)
Garo: Vanishing Line Anime (character designer, 2017)
Batman Ninja animated movie (character designer, 2018)
Sound and Fury Netflix film (artistic director, 2019)
Star Wars: Visions Episode 1: "The Duel" (character designer, concept artist, artistic director, 2021)

References

External links

                   

Living people
1974 births
Japanese graphic designers
Manga artists from Kanagawa Prefecture